Andriy Mykhailovych Poroshyn (born 30 September 1978) is a Ukrainian professional footballer. In April 2010, he joined FC Daugava from the Virsliga but left it in August the same year.

External links

 

1978 births
Living people
Ukrainian footballers
FC Zirka Kropyvnytskyi players
FC Sheriff Tiraspol players
FC Torpedo Kutaisi players
PFC Spartak Nalchik players
FC Shinnik Yaroslavl players
FC SKA Rostov-on-Don players
FC Salyut Belgorod players
Ukrainian expatriate footballers
Expatriate footballers in Moldova
Expatriate footballers in Georgia (country)
Expatriate footballers in Russia
Expatriate footballers in Latvia
Russian Premier League players
Association football forwards
FC Lokomotiv Moscow players